Leandro Leite Mateus is a Brazilian footballer who plays as a midfielder for São Luiz. He has captained the club Brasil de Pelotas since 2012 and made over 300 appearances in all competitions for the them, during which they have climbed from the second division of the state competition to Campeonato Brasileiro Série B.

Previously he has represented Ceilândia in Campeonato Brasileiro Série C between 2004 and 2007. He also represented Metropolitano in 2010 Campeonato Brasileiro Série D and Brusque in 2011 Campeonato Brasileiro Série D.

References

External links
 
 
 

Living people
1982 births
Brazilian footballers
Association football midfielders
Ceilândia Esporte Clube players
Goytacaz Futebol Clube players
Esporte Clube Democrata players
Americano Futebol Clube players
Clube Atlético Metropolitano players
Brusque Futebol Clube players
Esporte Clube São José players
Grêmio Esportivo Brasil players
Campeonato Brasileiro Série B players
Campeonato Brasileiro Série C players
Campeonato Brasileiro Série D players